Kinistino was a provincial electoral district for the Legislative Assembly of the province of Saskatchewan, Canada. Located in north-central Saskatchewan, it was centred on the town of Kinistino. This constituency was one of 25 created for the 1st Saskatchewan general election in 1905.

Dissolved and combined with the Melfort riding in 1971, the district was reconstituted before the 18th Saskatchewan general election in 1975. It was dissolved again in 1995 into Saskatchewan Rivers, Melfort-Tisdale, Humboldt and a small part to Prince Albert Carlton.

It is now part of the constituencies of Batoche, Melfort, and Saskatchewan Rivers.

Members of the Legislative Assembly

1905 – 1971

1975 – 1995

Election results

|-

 
|Provincial Rights
|Alfred Schmitz Shadd
|align="right"|609
|align="right"|47.92%
|align="right"|–
|- bgcolor="white"
!align="left" colspan=3|Total
!align="right"|1,271
!align="right"|100.00%
!align="right"|

|-
 
|style="width: 130px"|Provincial Rights
|George Balfour Johnston
|align="right"|1,000
|align="right"|52.97%
|align="right"|+5.05

|- bgcolor="white"
!align="left" colspan=3|Total
!align="right"|1,888
!align="right"|100.00%
!align="right"|

|-

 
|Conservative
|G.N. Giles
|align="right"|438
|align="right"|32.40%
|align="right"|-20.57
|- bgcolor="white"
!align="left" colspan=3|Total
!align="right"|1,352
!align="right"|100.00%
!align="right"|

|-

|- bgcolor="white"
!align="left" colspan=3|Total
!align="right"|Acclamation
!align="right"|

|-

 
|Conservative
|William M. Sproule
|align="right"|859
|align="right"|28.03%
|align="right"|-
|- bgcolor="white"
!align="left" colspan=3|Total
!align="right"|3,065
!align="right"|100.00%
!align="right"|

|-

 
|Independent
|John McCloy
|align="right"|1,733
|align="right"|47.68%
|align="right"|–
|- bgcolor="white"
!align="left" colspan=3|Total
!align="right"|3,635
!align="right"|100.00%
!align="right"|

|-

|- bgcolor="white"
!align="left" colspan=3|Total
!align="right"|3,675
!align="right"|100.00%
!align="right"|

|-

 
|Independent
|Silas W. Baker
|align="right"|2,361
|align="right"|42.51%
|align="right"|-
|- bgcolor="white"
!align="left" colspan=3|Total
!align="right"|5,554
!align="right"|100.00%
!align="right"|

|- bgcolor="white"
!align="left" colspan=3|Total
!align="right"|6,349
!align="right"|100.00%

|-

 
|Farmer-Labour
|Palmer Grambo
|align="right"|1,835
|align="right"|32.30%
|align="right"|–
 
|Conservative
|R.E. Forbes
|align="right"|1,074
|align="right"|18.91%
|align="right"|-15.16
|- bgcolor="white"
!align="left" colspan=3|Total
!align="right"|5,681
!align="right"|100.00%
!align="right"|

|-

 
|CCF
|William J. Boyle
|align="right"|1,482
|align="right"|21.88%
|align="right"|-10.42
 
|Conservative
|Andrew Fraser
|align="right"|560
|align="right"|8.27%
|align="right"|-10.64
|- bgcolor="white"
!align="left" colspan=3|Total
!align="right"|6,772
!align="right"|100.00%
!align="right"|

|-
 
|style="width: 130px"|CCF
|William J. Boyle
|align="right"|3,055
|align="right"|57.97%
|align="right"|+36.09

 
|Prog. Conservative
|Andrew Fraser
|align="right"|671
|align="right"|12.73%
|align="right"|+4.46
|- bgcolor="white"
!align="left" colspan=3|Total
!align="right"|5,270
!align="right"|100.00%
!align="right"|

|-

 
|CCF
|William J. Boyle
|align="right"|2,991
|align="right"|49.22%
|align="right"|-8.75
|- bgcolor="white"
!align="left" colspan=3|Total
!align="right"|6,077
!align="right"|100.00%
!align="right"|

|-
 
|style="width: 130px"|CCF
|Henry Begrand
|align="right"|4,186
|align="right"|58.67%
|align="right"|+9.45

|- bgcolor="white"
!align="left" colspan=3|Total
!align="right"|7,135
!align="right"|100.00%
!align="right"|

|-
 
|style="width: 130px"|CCF
|Henry Begrand
|align="right"|3,147
|align="right"|45.58%
|align="right"|-13.09

|- bgcolor="white"
!align="left" colspan=3|Total
!align="right"|6,905
!align="right"|100.00%
!align="right"|

|-
 
|style="width: 130px"|CCF
|Arthur Thibault
|align="right"|2,990
|align="right"|47.89%
|align="right"|+2.31

 
|Prog. Conservative
|Harvey Gjesdal
|align="right"|1,597
|align="right"|25.58%
|align="right"|-
|- bgcolor="white"
!align="left" colspan=3|Total
!align="right"|6,243
!align="right"|100.00%
!align="right"|

|-
 
|style="width: 130px"|CCF
|Arthur Thibault
|align="right"|2,731
|align="right"|42.17%
|align="right"|-5.72

 
|Prog. Conservative
|Harvey Gjesdal
|align="right"|994
|align="right"|15.34%
|align="right"|-10.24

|- bgcolor="white"
!align="left" colspan=3|Total
!align="right"|6,477
!align="right"|100.00%
!align="right"|

|-
 
|style="width: 130px"|CCF
|Arthur Thibault
|align="right"|3,334
|align="right"|51.62%
|align="right"|+9.45

|- bgcolor="white"
!align="left" colspan=3|Total
!align="right"|6,459
!align="right"|100.00%
!align="right"|

|-
 
|style="width: 130px"|NDP
|Arthur Thibault
|align="right"|3,260
|align="right"|54.48%
|align="right"|+2.86

|- bgcolor="white"
!align="left" colspan=3|Total
!align="right"|5,984
!align="right"|100.00%
!align="right"|

|-
 
|style="width: 130px"|NDP
|Arthur Thibault
|align="right"|3,215
|align="right"|44.21%
|align="right"|-

 
|Progressive Conservative
|Tom Smith
|align="right"|1,657
|align="right"|22.79%
|align="right"|-
|- bgcolor="white"
!align="left" colspan=3|Total
!align="right"|7,272
!align="right"|100.00%
!align="right"|

|-
 
|style="width: 130px"|NDP
|Donald Cody
|align="right"|4,042
|align="right"|54.55%
|align="right"|+10.34
 
|Progressive Conservative
|Louis A. Domotor
|align="right"|2,661
|align="right"|35.92%
|align="right"|+13.13

|- bgcolor="white"
!align="left" colspan=3|Total
!align="right"|7,409
!align="right"|100.00%
!align="right"|

|-
 
|style="width: 130px"|Progressive Conservative
|Bernard Boutin
|align="right"|4,266
|align="right"|51.57%
|align="right"|+15.65
 
|NDP
|Donald Cody
|align="right"|3,759
|align="right"|45.44%
|align="right"|-9.11

|- bgcolor="white"
!align="left" colspan=3|Total
!align="right"|8,272
!align="right"|100.00%
!align="right"|

|-
 
|style="width: 130px"|Progressive Conservative
|Joe Saxinger
|align="right"|3,900
|align="right"|49.11%
|align="right"|-2.46
 
|NDP
|Don Cody
|align="right"|3,748
|align="right"|47.20%
|align="right"|+1.76

|- bgcolor="white"
!align="left" colspan=3|Total
!align="right"|7,941
!align="right"|100.00%
!align="right"|

|-
 
|style="width: 130px"|NDP
|Armand Roy
|align="right"|4,298
|align="right"|50.32%
|align="right"|+3.12
 
|Progressive Conservative
|Joe Saxinger
|align="right"|2,918
|align="right"|34.16%
|align="right"|-14.95

|- bgcolor="white"
!align="left" colspan=3|Total
!align="right"|8,542
!align="right"|100.00%
!align="right"|

See also 
Kinistino – Northwest Territories territorial electoral district (1870–1905).

Electoral district (Canada)
List of Saskatchewan provincial electoral districts
List of Saskatchewan general elections
List of political parties in Saskatchewan
Kinistino, Saskatchewan

References 
 Saskatchewan Archives Board – Saskatchewan Election Results By Electoral Division

Former provincial electoral districts of Saskatchewan